Egodagama Grama Niladhari Division is a Grama Niladhari Division of the Seethawaka Divisional Secretariat  of Colombo District  of Western Province, Sri Lanka .  It has Grama Niladhari Division Code 431D.

Egodagama is a surrounded by the Puwakpitiya South, Weragolla South, Weragolla North and Puwakpitiya  Grama Niladhari Divisions.

Demographics

Ethnicity 

The Egodagama Grama Niladhari Division has a Sinhalese majority (86.0%) and a significant Sri Lankan Tamil population (12.3%) . In comparison, the Seethawaka Divisional Secretariat (which contains the Egodagama Grama Niladhari Division) has a Sinhalese majority (88.2%)

Religion 

The Egodagama Grama Niladhari Division has a Buddhist majority (69.4%), a significant Roman Catholic population (17.9%) and a significant Hindu population (10.9%) . In comparison, the Seethawaka Divisional Secretariat (which contains the Egodagama Grama Niladhari Division) has a Buddhist majority (81.5%)

Grama Niladhari Divisions of Seethawaka Divisional Secretariat

References